Talking Points Memo (TPM) is a liberal political news and opinion website created and run by Josh Marshall that debuted on November 12, 2000. The name is a reference to the memo (short list) consisting of the issues (points) discussed by one's side in a debate or used to support a position taken on an issue. By 2007, TPM received an average of 400,000 page views every weekday.

Growth 
Talking Points Memo was founded as a political blog in 2000 by Josh Marshall, who until 2004 was the site's sole employee. In 2005, TPM Media LLC was incorporated, and the company began to grow with more employees and spinoff websites. By 2009 it had 11 employees, and, having previously been funded by ads and reader donations, received angel investments from a group led by Marc Andreessen. In 2009,  TPM opened a Washington, D.C. office and joined the White House press pool along with several other progressive news outlets to cover the Obama administration.   The site introduced a subscription service, TPM Prime, in 2012, which by 2017 had over 21,000 subscribers.

Reception
Robert W. McChesney and John Nichols describe the site as taking a "more raucous and sensational" tone than traditional news media. This includes coining phrases such as "Bamboozlepalooza" to describe George W. Bush's efforts to privatize Social Security, which the blog opposed; and "bitch-slap politics" to refer to the Swiftboating of 2004 presidential candidate John Kerry.

McChesney and Nichols compare the site's style to the muckraking of Upton Sinclair. The more social aspects of the site, which invite crowdsourcing, were compared to La Follette's Weekly.  Tom Rosenstiel, director of the Project for Excellence in Journalism, in 2009 said "TPM is really an advocacy operation that has moved toward journalism."

Guest bloggers have included Matthew Yglesias, Robert Reich, Dean Baker, Michael Crowley, and, briefly, vice-presidential candidate John Edwards. Beginning in the summer of 2006, many weekend postings were provided by anonymous blogger DK. On November 11, 2006, DK was revealed to be attorney David Kurtz, who now posts openly under his name.

In 2007, TPM won a George Polk Award for Legal Reporting for its coverage of the 2006 U.S. Attorneys scandal, becoming the first online-only outlet to receive the award.

Related projects 
 TPMCafe - a "spin-off" blog also created by Josh Marshall, is a companion website that debuted on May 31, 2005. This site features a collection of blogs about a wide range of domestic and foreign policy issues written by academics, journalists, and former public officials, among others.
 TPMmuckraker - a new blog that was founded when Marshall expanded his operation where journalists working for the TPM collective, such as Paul Kiel and Justin Rood, investigate political corruption.
 TPMDC - founded in January 2007, the Horse's Mouth, is a blog authored by Greg Sargent with a remit to cover how Washington politics was covered by the major news outlets, that moved home from The American Prospect to the TPM Media family. Sargent had begun writing for TPMCafe in July 2006. In 2008, Sargent stopped posting to the Horse's Mouth blog and began posting to a new blog called TPM Election Central, which focused on covering the 2008 elections. In 2009, TPM Election Central was renamed TPMDC, to cover politics from Washington, D.C., and Marshall hired journalists based in Washington to report for the blog.
 TPMLiveWire - is a spin-off established in September 2009.
 TPMIdea Lab - is a blog established in January 2011 to cover science and technology.
 TPMPollTracker - is an aggregator of various polls about incumbents taken by polling agencies.
 TPMPrime - is a paid members-only section offering long form articles, and interactive discussions with journalists and political figures.

The four blogs (Talking Points Memo, TPMCafe, TPMMuckraker, and TPMDC) are published by TPM Media LLC.

References

External links 
 

American political blogs
Online magazines published in the United States
Internet properties established in 2000
Opinion polling in the United States
Liberalism in the United States